"That's How Strong My Love Is" is a song written by Roosevelt Jamison and first recorded in 1964 by deep soul singer O. V. Wright.

The song is a soulful love ballad and has been covered many times, most notably in 1965 by Otis Redding, with Redding's cover reaching no.18 on the Billboard R&B chart and no.74 on the US pop chart.  Redding's version is regarded as one of his signature songs.   The lyrics use natural phenomena such as the sun, the moon, and the ocean to describe the extent of the author's love.

Cover versions
Otis Redding's version appeared on his album The Great Otis Redding Sings Soul Ballads. Three other versions of the song were recorded in 1965, one by The Rolling Stones on their album Out of Our Heads, a second by The In Crowd, released as a single and the third by The Hollies on their 1966 album Would You Believe?. Millie, the "My Boy Lollipop" girl, recorded it on a single for Island Records, also in 1966.

Other versions
 The Rolling Stones recorded it for their 1965 album Out of Our Heads and also for their live album Live Licks, released in 2004  
 The Hollies recorded it for their 1966 album Would You Believe?
 Percy Sledge released his version on his 1966 Atlantic album Warm and Tender Soul
 The Sweet Inspirations also covered the song as their third single release on Atlantic in 1968
 Steve Young on his 1969 album Rock Salt & Nails
 Candi Staton on her 1970 album I'm Just a Prisoner
 The Youngbloods on their 1971 album Good and Dusty
 Humble Pie on their 1973 album Eat It
 Little Milton on his 1973 album Waiting for Little Milton
 Bryan Ferry on his 1978 solo album The Bride Stripped Bare
 Taj Mahal on his 1993 album Dancing the Blues
 Roland Gift of the Fine Young Cannibals covered the song for the soundtrack to the 1996 movie Beautiful Girls
 Buddy Miller recorded the song on "Poison Love" in 1997
 ? and the Mysterians recorded a version on their 1999 album More Action.
 Doyle Bramhall covered this song on his 2003 album Fitchburg Street
 The Doughboys on their 2008 album Is It Now
 Seven Mary Three on their 2010 live and acoustic album Backbooth
 In 2011, Battlefield Band included a cover of the song on their album, Line Up, sung in the style of a folk-ballad
 In 2011, Jon Stevens included a cover on his album, Testify!
 Chris Robinson Brotherhood on the b-side of their 2012 single Older Guys
 Mick Hucknall on his 2012 album American Soul
 Billie Ray Martin on her 2016 album The Soul Tapes
 [Howard "Guitar" Luedke recorded the song on his album "Goin' Down to Alabama" recorded at Muscle Shoals Sound Studio

References

External links
Song Facts: "That's How Strong My Love Is"

1964 songs
1964 singles
Otis Redding songs
The Youngbloods songs
Soul songs